Let It Burn is the debut EP by Nebula.  It features a more psychedelic experimental sound as opposed to the straightforward approach of Eddie Glass' former band Fu Manchu. It was out of print until re-released in 2018 by Heavy Psych Sounds Records.

Track listing

Personnel
Eddie Glass – guitar, vocals, percussion
Ruben Romano – drums, percussion, sitar
Mark Abshire – bass

Credits

 1-6 recorded at Rancho de la Luna, Joshua Tree, CA May 97
 Engineered by Fred Drake
 Mastered by John Golden
 1997 Volcanic Pineeapple ASCAP
 7-8 recorded at LoHo Studios, New York, NY June 1998
 Engineered by Joe Hogan
 Mastered by Dave Shirk at Sonorous Mastering, Tempe, AZ
 1998 Volcanic Pineapple ASCAP
 All songs produced by Nebula
 All music by Eddie Glass
 Lyrics by Eddie Glass/Ruben Romano
 Band Photos: Alex Obleas
 Illustration: Ruben Romano
 Graphics/Layout: Mark Abshire

Sources
AMG []
Nebula's Website

References

Nebula (band) EPs
1998 EPs
Relapse Records EPs